Lampson is a surname. Notable people with the surname include:

Butler Lampson (born 1943), computer scientist
Sir Curtis Lampson, 1st Baronet (1806–1885), businessman and 1st Baronet of Rowfant
E. W. Lampson (1904–1997), member of the Ohio House of Representatives
Elbert L. Lampson (1852–1930), American politician
Elmar Lampson (born 1952), German composer and academic
Miles Lampson, 1st Baron Killearn (1880–1964), British diplomat
Nick Lampson, (born 1945), American politician

See also
Frederick Locker-Lampson (1821–1895), English poet
Godfrey Locker-Lampson (1875–1946) British politician
Oliver Locker-Lampson (1880–1954) British politician